Toy Story 4 is a 2019 American computer-animated comedy-drama film  produced by Pixar Animation Studios for Walt Disney Pictures. It is the fourth   installment in Pixar's Toy Story series and the sequel to Toy Story 3 (2010). It was directed by Josh Cooley (in his feature directorial debut) from a screenplay by Andrew Stanton and Stephany Folsom; the three also conceived the story alongside John Lasseter, Rashida Jones, Will McCormack, Valerie LaPointe, and Martin Hynes. Tom Hanks, Tim Allen, Annie Potts, Joan Cusack, Don Rickles, Wallace Shawn, John Ratzenberger, Estelle Harris, Blake Clark, Jeff Pidgeon, Bonnie Hunt, Jeff Garlin, Kristen Schaal, and Timothy Dalton reprise their character roles from the first three films, and are joined by Tony Hale, Keegan-Michael Key, Jordan Peele, Christina Hendricks, Keanu Reeves, and Ally Maki, who voice new characters introduced in this film. Set after the third film, Toy Story 4 follows Woody (Hanks) and Buzz Lightyear (Allen) as the pair and the other toys go on a road trip with Bonnie (McGraw), who creates Forky (Hale), a spork made with recycled materials from her school. Meanwhile, Woody is reunited with Bo Peep (Potts), and must decide where his loyalties lie.

Talks for a fourth film to Toy Story began in 2010, and Hanks stated that Pixar was working on the sequel in 2011. When the film was officially announced in November 2014 during an investor's call, it was reported that the film would be directed by Lasseter, who later announced it would be love story, after writing a film treatment with Stanton, and input from Pete Docter and Lee Unkrich, while Galyn Susman would served as the producer. Cooley was named co-director with Lasseter in March 2015, while Pixar president Jim Morris said it was not a continuation of the third film, who described the film as a romantic comedy. In July 2017 at the D23 Expo, Lasseter was stepping down and leaving Cooley as the sole director. New characters for the film were announced between in 2018 and 2019 along with new cast members. Composer Randy Newman returned to score the film, making his ninth collaboration with Pixar. The film is dedicated to Don Rickles (the voice of Mr. Potato Head) and animator Adam Burke, who died on April 6, 2017, and October 8, 2018, respectively.

Toy Story 4 premiered in Los Angeles on June 11, 2019, and was released in the United States on June 21. It grossed $1.073 billion worldwide, becoming the eighth-highest-grossing film of 2019. Like its predecessors, the film received critical acclaim, with praise for its story, humor, emotional weight, musical score, animation, and vocal performances. The film was nominated for two awards at the 92nd Academy Awards, winning Best Animated Feature, and received numerous other accolades. A sequel is in development.

Plot 

Between the events of Toy Story 2 and Toy Story 3, Woody and Bo Peep rescue Andy's remote control car, RC, from being washed away in a storm. Moments later, Bo Peep and her  lamp are donated to a new owner. A distraught Woody tries to rescue her, but Bo refuses, having already accepted her fate as it is a part of a toy's life. Woody is tempted to go with her, but once he realizes that Andy still needs him, he decides to stay, and shares a heartfelt goodbye with Bo.

Nine years later, after a college-bound Andy has donated his toys to Bonnie, Woody struggles to adapt as the toys in Bonnie's room already have a leader: Dolly. Bonnie also shows little interest in playing with him. Woody still remains convinced Bonnie must need him, and sneaks into her backpack the day of her kindergarten orientation. When another child steals Bonnie's art supplies, Woody gathers objects from the trash and leaves them on Bonnie's table. Bonnie creates a doll from a spork and some other odds and ends, naming him Forky. Forky comes to life, but suffers an existential crisis, seeing himself as a disposable utensil, not a toy. As Forky quickly becomes Bonnie's new favorite toy, Woody repeatedly has to stop him from throwing himself away.

When Bonnie's family goes on a road trip, Forky jumps out the window of the moving RV. Woody does the same, despite Buzz Lightyear's protests. As they walk to the RV park, Woody finally convinces Forky that his place is with Bonnie, which Forky overcomes his existential crisis. As they pass an antique store's window, Woody recognizes Bo Peep's lamp, and detours inside to find her. They encounter a talking doll named Gabby Gabby and her ventriloquist dummy friends, who immediately try to take Woody's voice box to replace Gabby's broken one. Woody escapes the store, though Forky does not. At a playground, Woody reunites with Bo Peep and her sheep, who have deliberately become "Lost Toys", free from any owners and able to do as they please, along with their new friend, a miniature police officer toy named Giggles McDimples with a skunk-like vehicle called the Skunkmobile. They agree to help Woody rescue Forky.

Buzz, trying to find Woody, gets lost in a carnival and becomes a prize at a game, but escapes with plush toys Bunny and Ducky. They meet up with Woody and Bo, who leads them to a secret toy party inside a pinball machine, where they find Canadian stunt bike toy Duke Caboom. They twice attempt to rescue Forky (who is actually enjoying himself and is in no danger) but fail both times. After McDimples is nearly killed by the store owner's cat, the toys argue about whether or not to go back. Woody, still desperate to be of some use to Bonnie, inadvertently insults Bo by saying loyalty is not something a "Lost Toy" can understand. He is left alone to attempt to rescue Forky, but when he confronts Gabby, she explains to him she has wanted a child's love for more than 60 years. Woody sympathizes and gives her his voice box on the condition Forky is released.

As Woody and Forky leave, they see Gabby callously rejected by Harmony, the store owner's granddaughter. Woody leaves Forky to go on alone and convinces Gabby to come back to Bonnie's house with him. Bo, Caboom, McDimples, Bunny and Ducky return, and help the pair escape to the fairgrounds. Jessie, after Forky informs her of the situation, rallies Bonnie's toys to take over the controls of the RV and drive it back to the fair. As Woody's group approaches the RV, Gabby notices a lost and upset little girl and stops to comfort her. The little girl is found by her parents and keeps Gabby as her toy.

Woody and Bo Peep decide they must leave each other again, but Buzz convinces Woody that Bonnie is okay without him, and that he is free to stay with Bo as a “Lost Toy” along with McDimples, Caboom, Ducky and Bunny. Woody gives his badge to Jessie and his longtime friends share an emotional goodbye with him and leave with Bonnie. The "Lost Toys" then dedicate themselves to traveling with the carnival and helping prize toys find new owners.

Voice cast 

 Tom Hanks as Woody
 Tim Allen as Buzz Lightyear
 Annie Potts as Bo Peep
 Tony Hale as Forky
 Keegan-Michael Key as Ducky
 Jordan Peele as Bunny
 Madeleine McGraw as Bonnie
 Christina Hendricks as Gabby Gabby
 Keanu Reeves as Duke Caboom
 Ally Maki as Giggle McDimples
 Jay Hernandez as Bonnie's dad
 Lori Alan as Bonnie's mom
 Joan Cusack as Jessie
 Wallace Shawn as Rex
 John Ratzenberger as Hamm
 Blake Clark as Slinky Dog
 Don Rickles as Mr. Potato Head
 Estelle Harris as Mrs. Potato Head
 Jeff Pidgeon as Aliens
 Bonnie Hunt as Dolly
 Kristen Schaal as Trixie
 Timothy Dalton as Mr. Pricklepants
 Jeff Garlin as Buttercup
 Emily Davis as Billy, Goat, and Gruff
 John Morris as Andy
 Jack McGraw as young Andy
 Laurie Metcalf as Andy's mother
 June Squibb as Margaret
 Carl Weathers as Combat Carl
 Maliah Bargas-Good as Lost Girl
 Juliana Hansen as Miss Wendy
 Steve Purcell as Benson and The Dummies
 Lila Sage Bromley as Harmony
 Mel Brooks as Melephant Brooks
 Carol Burnett as Chairol Burnett
 Betty White as Bitey White
 Carl Reiner as Carl Reineroceros 
 Alan Oppenheimer as Old Timer
 Patricia Arquette as Harmony's Mother
 Bill Hader as Axel the Carnie
 Flea as the Duke Caboom commercial announcer
 Melissa Villaseñor as Karen Beverly
 Rickey Henderson as an Oakland Athletics bobblehead figure

Production

Development 
In 2010, Toy Story 3 director Lee Unkrich said that Pixar was not planning another Toy Story film, saying, "It was really important to me with this film that we not just create another sequel, that it not just be another appendage coming off of the other two... there may be opportunities for Woody and Buzz in the future, but we don't have any plans for anything right now." Tom Hanks and Tim Allen had tentatively signed on to reprise their roles of Woody and Buzz; Hanks stated the following year that he believed Pixar was working on a sequel. Rumors arose that Toy Story 4 was in production and slated for release for 2015, but Disney dismissed these rumors in February 2013.

Disney officially announced Toy Story 4 during an investor's call on November 6, 2014. Then-studio head of Pixar John Lasseter, who directed the first two films and executive-produced the third, was scheduled to direct after writing a film treatment with Andrew Stanton, with input from Pete Docter and Unkrich. Rashida Jones and Will McCormack joined as writers, with Galyn Susman returning as a producer from Ratatouille. Lasseter explained that Pixar decided to produce the sequel because of their "pure passion" for the series, and that the film would be a love story. He felt that "Toy Story 3 ended Woody and Buzz's story with Andy so perfectly that for a long time, [Pixar] never even talked about doing another Toy Story film. But when Andrew, Pete, Lee and I came up with this new idea, I just could not stop thinking about it."

In March 2015, Pixar president Jim Morris described the film as a romantic comedy and said it would not be a continuation of the third film. The same month, Variety reported that Josh Cooley was named co-director with Lasseter, having previously been head of story on Inside Out. According to Lasseter, the film was kept so secret that even Morris and his boss Edwin Catmull had no knowledge of it until the treatment was finished. He stressed that "we do not do any sequel because we want to print money" but rather to tell a new story. Cooley later revealed that development of a fourth film had actually begun shortly before the release of the third film.

During the 2017 D23 Expo, Lasseter announced he was stepping down and leaving Cooley as sole director, saying he could no longer commit to directing the film between his positions at Pixar, Walt Disney Animation Studios, and Disneytoon Studios. Jones and McCormack withdrew in November 2017, citing "philosophical differences."

By January 2018, Disney had confirmed that the screenplay was being written by Stephany Folsom, who eventually rewrote three quarters of Jones and McCormack's original script, according to Annie Potts. Folsom collaborated on the screenplay with Stanton, who had co-wrote the first two films. According to Cooley, the center of the film's updated screenplay was around the relationship of Woody and Bo Peep. Bo Peep had been absent in Toy Story 3, explained narratively as Bo Peep having been given away. This had set the stage for the conclusion of the third film, with Woody getting the idea to give Andy's toys to Bonnie. Cooley said that when they thought about bringing Bo Peep back in the fourth film, it was not only to rekindle the romantic interest between Woody and Bo Peep. Bo Peep's becoming a lost toy also reflects a fear Woody has had through the series, and challenges his world view. By September 28, 2018, recording for the film had begun. Allen said that the film's story was "so emotional" that he "couldn't even get through the last scene." Similarly, Hanks called the film's ending scene a "moment in history." On January 30, 2019, Hanks and Allen finished recording their characters' voices.

Casting 

Most of the previous voice actors, including Tom Hanks and Tim Allen, signed on to reprise their roles. Hanks stated in May 2016 that he had recorded his first lines for Woody. Annie Potts was confirmed to return as Bo Peep, after being absent from Toy Story 3. Potts was told by Pixar's then chief creative officer John Lasseter that her character's absence in the third film was attributed to them saving her for the fourth. Don Rickles intended to reprise his role as Mr. Potato Head, but died in April 2017, before any lines were recorded as the script was still being rewritten. According to Cooley, Rickles' family contacted Pixar to search ways for his inclusion in the film. Pixar reviewed 25 years of archival material that Rickles had participated in, including unused lines from the first three Toy Story films, video games and other related media for the franchise, and other works, and repurposed them for use within the film.

Tony Hale was cast as Forky, a homemade toy suffering an existential crisis. Hale has performed roles before with similar panicked characters, including Buster Bluth on Arrested Development and Gary Walsh on Veep. When asked to voice Forky, Hale said, "A utensil's existential crisis? I'm in!" Keegan-Michael Key and Jordan Peele were cast as a pair of carnival prize plush toys named Ducky and Bunny. Cooley said that while they brought them on to provide some improvised comedy to the film, "they were story motivated which elevated Ducky and Bunny and the film to a level I never could have expected." Additionally, Keanu Reeves was announced to be voicing a character in the film named Duke Caboom. Reeves said he was contacted by Pixar, much to his surprise, with the intention of voicing the part and letting him develop the character's verbal mannerisms. On March 22, 2019, Madeleine McGraw, who had previously voiced Maddy McGear in Pixar's Cars 3, was revealed to be voicing Bonnie, who was voiced by Emily Hahn in the previous film and other works. Comedians Carol Burnett, Mel Brooks, Carl Reiner, and Betty White were added to the cast to voice a set of four toys that Bonnie played with as a toddler but had since outgrown, acting as "veteran" toys to help Woody prepare for when the same happens to him.

Music

Randy Newman, who composed and wrote songs for the previous three films, was confirmed to be returning during the 2015 D23 Expo. Director Josh Cooley said that he hired Newman to return because he "can't imagine making a fourth [film] without Randy Newman." Newman wrote new themes for Bonnie, Gabby Gabby, and Duke Caboom, with the latter's featuring accordions and mandolins to represent the character's memories of rejection. He also wrote a "subordinate theme" for Forky. Newman also reused his previous orchestral themes from the first three films. He wrote two new songs for the film, titled "The Ballad of the Lonesome Cowboy" and "I Can't Let You Throw Yourself Away", with Newman also performing the latter. On June 5, 2019, Chris Stapleton's version of "Cowboy" was released as a single. The film's soundtrack, featuring Newman's score, Stapleton's and Newman's versions of the two new songs, and Newman's "You've Got a Friend in Me", was released on June 21, 2019.

Release 
Toy Story 4 premiered on June 11, 2019, at the El Capitan Theatre in Los Angeles. The film was originally scheduled for general release on June 16, 2017, but it was pushed back by two release dates, first to June 15, 2018, and later to June 21, 2019. Toy Story 4 was the first Pixar film without a theatrical short since Toy Story (1995), and was also released in IMAX.

Walt Disney Studios Home Entertainment released Toy Story 4 for digital download on October 1, 2019, and on DVD, Blu-ray, and Ultra HD Blu-ray on October 8. Physical copies contain behind-the-scenes featurettes and deleted scenes. The film made a revenue of $56.3 million from home video sales with 2.8 million units sold, making it the fifth best-selling film of 2019.

Reception

Box office 
Toy Story 4 grossed  in the United States and Canada, and $639.4 million in other territories, for a worldwide total of $1.073 billion. It was the eighth-highest-grossing film of 2019. The film had a worldwide opening of $244.5 million, the third biggest for an animated film. It crossed the billion dollar mark on August 13, 2019, becoming the 43rd film as well as the fourth Pixar film to ever do so. It was also the fifth film released by Disney in 2019, and sixth overall, to cross the milestone, both records for a single year. Deadline Hollywood calculated the film's net profit as $368million, accounting for production budgets, marketing, talent participations, and other costs; box office grosses and home media revenues placed it sixth on their list of 2019's "Most Valuable Blockbusters".

In the United States and Canada, On May 28, 2019, Toy Story 4 set the records on Fandango for most tickets sold by an animated film in its first 24 hours of pre-sales (besting Incredibles 2), while Atom Tickets reported it sold nearly 50% more than the previous three highest-selling animated films combined did in their first day (Incredibles 2, Ralph Breaks the Internet, and Hotel Transylvania 3: Summer Vacation). Released alongside Child's Play and Anna on June 21, 2019, Toy Story 4 played in 4,575 theaters, the second-most all-time behind Avengers: Endgame. Toy Story 4 made $47.4 million on its first day, including $12 million from Thursday night previews, the second-highest amount for an animated film, behind Incredibles 2. It went on to debut to $120.9 million. Although below projections, executives at Disney were satisfied with the debut, since it continued Pixar's "remarkable consistency" at the box office and showed "proof of audiences' long-time love for the Toy Story franchise." Additionally, it was the best opening of the series, the biggest for a G-rated film and the fourth-highest of all-time for an animated film. The film opened in the number #1 spot and retained the top position at the box office the following weekend, but it was dethroned by Spider-Man: Far From Home in July. Its second weekend saw the box office drop by 51% to $59.7 million, and Toy Story 4 grossed another $34.3 million the following weekend. In August 2019, the film surpassed The Lion King (1994, $422 million including re-releases), which held the title for the last 25 years (1994–2003 and 2011–2019) to become the highest-grossing G-rated film of all-time domestically. It ended up being the fifth highest-grossing film of 2019 in this region.

In other territories, the film opened day-and-date with the U.S. in 37 countries (64% of its total market), and was projected to gross around $100 million abroad for a global debut of $260 million. In China, where the film opened alongside a re-release of Spirited Away (2001), it was expected to debut to $15–20 million. Through September 2, 2019, the film's largest markets were Japan ($90.1 million), the United Kingdom ($79.9 million, third highest all-time for an animated film), Mexico ($72 million), Brazil ($32.5 million), France ($29.2 million), China ($29.1 million), Argentina ($28.9 million), Australia ($28.9 million), and South Korea ($24.7 million).

Critical response 
The website's critics consensus reads, "Heartwarming, funny, and beautifully animated, Toy Story 4 manages the unlikely feat of extending – and perhaps concluding – a practically perfect animated saga." Metacritic, which uses a weighted average, assigned the film a score of 84 out of 100 based on 57 critics, indicating "universal acclaim." Audiences polled by CinemaScore gave the film an average grade of "A" on an A+ to F scale, and 89% of those at PostTrak gave it a positive score, with 75% saying they would definitely recommend it.

The film received a four-star rating from Matt Zoller Seitz of RogerEbert.com, who wrote "This franchise has demonstrated an impressive ability to beat the odds and reinvent itself, over a span of time long enough for two generations to grow up in. It's a toy store of ideas, with new wonders in every aisle." The Washington Posts Ann Hornaday also gave the film four out of four stars and praised its "visually dazzling concoction of wily schemes and daring adventures", as well as achieving "a near-perfect balance between familiarity and novelty, action and emotion, and joyful hellos and more bittersweet goodbyes." Peter DeBruge of Variety wrote "Toy Story ushered in the era of computer-animated cartoon features, and the fourth movie wraps up the saga beautifully. At least, for now." The Daily Telegraphs Robbie Collin wrote "Toy Story 4 reaffirms that Pixar, at their best, are like no other animation studio around."

Writing for IndieWire, David Ehrlich gave the film a grade of B+ and wrote "Clever, breathless, and never manic just for the sake of keeping your kids' eyes busy, the action in Toy Story 4 is character-driven and paced to perfection." Peter Travers of Rolling Stone, who gave the film four-and-a-half stars out of five stars, praised its "visual pow, pinwheeling fun and soulful feeling" and lauded the voice performance of Tony Hale as Forky. Joe Morgenstern of The Wall Street Journal said that "the new film isn't flawless, but it's hugely enjoyable and speaks, with bewitching buoyancy, to nothing less than the purpose of living and the mystery of life." While Peter Rainer of The Christian Science Monitor wrote that the film did not put him "through the emotional wringer the way its predecessor did," he still gave it a grade of A- and said "it's consistently inventive, funny, witty, and heartfelt. In other words, it's a lot better than it has any right to be. It's more than good enough to justify its existence."

Conversely, Kyle Smith of National Review called the film "the weakest effort in the series so far", finding its subject matter was unclear and the motives of the characters opposed and undermined the series' previous installments. He further critiqued the film for prioritizing its comedy while the story's underlying themes were "tossed out haphazardly without much follow-through", saying "It may be an essential element of Disney's corporate strategy, but as a film it's forgettable."

Accolades

At the 92nd Academy Awards, Toy Story 4 received a nomination for Best Original Song and won Best Animated Feature. The film's other nominations include six Annie Awards, a British Academy Film Award, a Critics' Choice Movie Award (which it won), and a Golden Globe Award.

Future

Sequel 
In February 2019, Allen expressed interest in doing another film as he "did not see any reason why they would not do it". That May, producer Mark Nielsen confirmed that after Toy Story 4, Pixar would return its focus to making original films instead of sequels for a while. On The Ellen DeGeneres Show, Hanks said that Toy Story 4 would be the final installment in the franchise, but Nielsen disclosed a possibility of a fifth film, as Pixar was not ruling out that possibility. In February 2023, during an announcement of major layoffs at Disney, CEO Bob Iger also announced that the franchise would continue with a fifth film. Allen confirmed that he will return as the voice of Buzz in the sequel. Later in the month, Pixar CCO and franchise alumni, Pete Docter stated that the film will be "surprising" and will have "cool things you've never seen before."

Spin-off 

A spin-off of the main series of films entitled Lightyear was released on June 17, 2022, directed by Angus MacLane. It starred Chris Evans as the voice of a human Buzz Lightyear, and focused on Buzz's in-universe backstory before he became a famous toy. The film received generally positive reviews, but was a box-office bomb, grossing only $226 million on a $200 million budget.

Short film 
A short film titled Lamp Life reveals Bo Peep's whereabouts between leaving and reuniting with Woody. The short was released on Disney+ on January 31, 2020.

Series 

A 10-episode short-form educational series, Forky Asks a Question, debuted exclusively on the Disney+ streaming service upon its launch on November 12, 2019. It focuses mainly on Forky, but other Toy Story characters such as Rex, Hamm, Trixie, Buttercup, and Mr. Pricklepants also make appearances.

Lawsuit 
Evel Knievel's son Kelly and K&K Promotions sued Disney and Pixar in September 2020 for using his father's likeness without permission to the character Duke Caboom. On September 23, 2021, the judge dismissed the case and stated "Duke Caboom is not a carbon copy of Evel Knievel minus a few details, The Duke Caboom action figure is a representation of Disney’s expression in the film and not an attempt to imitate Evel Knievel."

Notes

References

External links 

 
 
 
 
 

2010s American animated films
2010s children's animated films
2010s English-language films
2019 3D films
2019 comedy-drama films
2019 computer-animated films
2019 directorial debut films
2019 films
3D animated films
American 3D films
American computer-animated films
American sequel films
American animated comedy films
Best Animated Feature Academy Award winners
Best Animated Feature Broadcast Film Critics Association Award winners
Disney controversies
Existentialist films
Film controversies
Films about toys
Films about vacationing
Films directed by Josh Cooley
Films involved in plagiarism controversies
Films scored by Randy Newman
Films set in amusement parks
Films with screenplays by Andrew Stanton
Films with screenplays by John Lasseter
IMAX films
Pixar animated films
Sentient toys in fiction
Toy Story
Walt Disney Pictures animated films